Urminnes Hävd (The Forest Sessions) is an EP of purely folk music by the Viking metal band Månegarm. It was recorded with the folk band Två Fisk Och En Fläsk and released in 2006.

Track listing
"Intro" - 0:15
"Himmelsfursten" - 3:27 (The Lord of the Heavens)
"Utfärd" - 3:05 (Excursion)
"Älvatrans" - 4:34 (Elven Trance)
"Hemkomst" - 5:06 (Homecoming)
"Döden" - 6:52 (Death)
"Vaggvisa" - 3:35 (Lullaby)

Guest musicians
 Umer Mossige-Norheim - vocals
 Stefan Grapenmark - cowdrum
Gustaf Esers - djembe, percussion

External links
 Månegarm's official website

Månegarm albums
2006 EPs